The Sisters is a 2011 film based on a true story from Serbia about human trafficking. The film was directed by Vladimir Paskaljević. The scenario was written by Vladimir Paskaljević, Milena Marković and Bojana Maljević. Maljević was also one of the producers.

The film premiered in Serbian theaters on 10 April 2011  and on Serbian television on Prva TV (former TV Fox) on 4 June 2011.

The cast consisted of unknown actors making their debut in the film, except for the oldest actor of the film, Velimir Bata Živojinović, playing the role of the sisters' grandfather. All other actors remain relatively unknown, and include Ljubomir Bandović who starred as kidnapper Tadija, and Ivana Vuković.

References

External links

"The Sisters" at Blic 
"The Sisters". at Filmske.com
"The Sisters" at B92 
"The Sisters" at Vesti.rs

2011 films
Serbian drama films
Films set in Serbia
2010s Serbian-language films